Jonathan Linsley (born 17 January 1956) is an English actor who made his professional debut in 1980. He appeared on television in Last of the Summer Wine as "Crusher" Milburn (1984–87), and his film roles include Pirates of the Caribbean: Dead Man's Chest and Pirates of the Caribbean: At World's End, as Ogilvey aboard the ship Flying Dutchman (2006–07).

Early life
Linsley's father was from Ramsgate, Kent, and his mother from Cockfield, County Durham; they met during the Second World War when his father was stationed with the tank regiment at Barnard Castle. Linsley was born at Bradford, and raised at Halesowen, near Birmingham, from the age of three, when his father's work dictated relocation, then at Tamworth, Staffordshire. When his father retired from industry, he bought a shop in the town of Skipton, North Yorkshire. Here Linsley attended Ermysted's Grammar School, during which time he joined the National Youth Theatre, then, despite an interest in working as an actor (encouraged by Only Fools and Horses actor Kenneth MacDonald, who directed Linsley in a play), he was persuaded by his parents to attend university; he initially read English and American Studies at the University of Warwick, but changed courses after the first year, to Theatre Studies. He was then awarded one of two available bursaries, enabling him to undertake a one-year post-graduate course at the Bristol Old Vic Theatre School. After completing his studies he entered repertory theatre at Ipswich, before getting his first television work in advertisements. He won the role of "Crusher" Milburn in the 1985 Last of the Summer Wine stage play, which went on a short commercial tour including the Beck Theatre at Hayes, Hillingdon, Cardiff, and Eastbourne.

Television 
In 1984, played a chef in a sitcom called The Hello Good-bye Man on BBC with Ian Lavender. The show lasted for only one series. Shortly after this, Linsley took the role of large and strong, but dim-witted, "Crusher" Milburn in Last of the Summer Wine. He appeared in this role until 1987 when he elected to go on a diet. In 1989, Linsley starred as Chunky Livesey in the second and final series of the spin-off prequel First of the Summer Wine, to replace Anthony Keetch who starred as the character in the first series in 1988.

Linsley also appeared as a leading character in the TV shows Emmerdale (Albert Mistlethwaite), Casualty (DC Newby), The Bill (Dennis Weaver) and The Governor (Bert Threlfall) and as a leading guest actor in many other TV shows and made-for-TV films. He has also made over 50 TV commercials.

Theatre
His West End career includes the comedy Up'n'Under, Roald Dahl's Matilda, Its Ralph and A Midsummer Night's Dream. He appeared in rep in many cities around Britain, and wrote for and appeared in pantomimes with various other actors.

Filmography

Film

Television

References

External links
 New York Times listing
 
 

1956 births
Living people
Male actors from Bradford
English male film actors
English male television actors
English male stage actors
People educated at Ermysted's Grammar School
Alumni of the University of Warwick
Alumni of Bristol Old Vic Theatre School